Małgorzata Breś (born 31 December 1959) is a Polish fencer. She competed in the women's team foil event at the 1988 Summer Olympics in Seoul. Her country, Poland, ranked 10th in the teams competing. She competed in 11 matches with her team.

References

External links
 

1959 births
Living people
Polish female fencers
Olympic fencers of Poland
Fencers at the 1988 Summer Olympics
Sportspeople from Lublin
20th-century Polish women